Events in the year 2013 in Portugal.

Incumbents
President: Aníbal Cavaco Silva
Prime Minister: Pedro Passos Coelho

Events
 29 September - Local election

Arts and entertainment
For Portuguese films first released in 2013, see List of Portuguese films of 2013. For music albums that reached number-one, see List of number-one albums of 2013 (Portugal).
 25 February - Prémio Autores
 6 October - Sophia Awards

Sports
In association football, for the first-tier league seasons, see 2012–13 Primeira Liga and 2013–14 Primeira Liga; for the cup seasons, see 2012–13 Taça de Portugal and 2013–14 Taça de Portugal; for the league cup seasons, see 2012–13 Taça da Liga and 2013–14 Taça da Liga; for the second-tier league seasons, see 2012–13 Segunda Liga and 2013–14 Segunda Liga; for the third-tier league season, see 2013–14 Campeonato Nacional. See also 2012–13 Terceira Divisão. For transfers, see List of Portuguese football transfers summer 2013.
 14–17 February - Volta ao Algarve
 6–13 March - Algarve Cup
 11–14 April - Rally de Portugal
 28 April – 5 May - Portugal Open
 26 May - Taça de Portugal Final
 30 June - FIA WTCC Race of Portugal
 19 July – 4 August - Portugal at the 2013 World Aquatics Championships
 7–18 August - Volta a Portugal 
 10 August - Supertaça Cândido de Oliveira
 10–18 August - Portugal at the 2013 World Championships in Athletics
 22–29 September - Portugal at the 2013 UCI Road World Championships
 16–28 October - Acrobatic Gymnastics European Championships
 Establishment of the Taça de Portugal de Futsal Feminino.

See also
List of Portuguese films of 2013

References

 
Years of the 21st century in Portugal
Portugal